Grégoire Munster (born 24 December 1998) is a Belgian rally driver driving with a licence from Luxemburg.
His father has the Belgian and his mother the Luxembourgish nationality but he drives with a licence from Luxemburg because he receives some financial support from the Automobile Federation of Luxemburg. He holds the double nationality but lives in Belgium.

Career
Munster joined the Customer Racing Junior Driver programme of Hyundai Motorsport in 2022. He is set to move to M-Sport to compete the WRC-2 category.

Rally results

WRC results

* Season still in progress.

References

External links
 Grégoire Munster's e-wrc profile

1998 births
Living people
Belgian rally drivers
Luxembourgish rally drivers
World Rally Championship drivers